Ögii Lake is a freshwater lake in eastern Arkhangai, in central Mongolia. The lake, designated as a Ramsar Site of International Importance, is known for its fish and for birdlife. It is a stopover point for migrating waterbirds of the family Anatidae.

There are several ger tourist camps around the lake, as well an information and training center.

See also
Ramsar sites in Mongolia

References

Lakes of Mongolia
Ramsar sites in Mongolia